The Shell Centre in London is the global headquarters of oil major Shell plc. 
It is located on Belvedere Road in the London Borough of Lambeth. It is a prominent feature on the South Bank of the River Thames near County Hall, and now forms the backdrop to the London Eye.

The original Shell Centre comprised the tower building and three now-demolished adjoining nine-storey wings (collectively formerly known as the "Upstream Building"). The original development also included a separate building known as the "Downstream Building", which was separated from the Upstream Building by the railway viaduct between Charing Cross and Waterloo East.

The Downstream Building was disposed of by Shell in the 1990s. It has been heightened by one storey and is now a block of residential apartments known as the White House.

Site history and layout
The Shell Centre occupies part of the site cleared for the 1951 Festival of Britain. The areas closer to the River Thames now include Jubilee Gardens and the South Bank Centre. Jubilee Gardens remained undeveloped prior to its laying out as an open space, largely because of a restrictive covenant in favour of Shell that restricts any building on the part of the site directly between the Shell Tower and the River Thames.

The naming of the Shell Centre buildings perpetuated the split of the Festival site into distinct Upstream and Downstream areas, separated by the railway viaduct approach to Hungerford Bridge.

During construction, parts of abandoned works for the Waterloo and Whitehall Railway were discovered. This was a prototype for a proposed pneumatic railway that would have run under the River Thames linking Waterloo and Charing Cross. Digging was started in 1865, but was stopped in 1868, due to financial problems.

Visible in the Thames at low tide just in line with the tower as water turbulence at one point a few feet into the river bed is the outflow point of the Shell Centre's air conditioning system, which sucks in river water from just outside County Hall and sends it via a pipe within a bolt iron tunnel (built exactly like a tube railway tunnel), to a point convergent with the outfall, beyond which both the intake pipe and the outflow pipes continue under the embankment and Jubilee Gardens to the basement of the tower.

From here the water is sent through filters and heat exchangers to provide cooled air in the building. The pipes had to be specially supported on adjustable jacks, during excavation work for the extension of the Jubilee line in 1995, because of settlement during the driving of an access tunnel out from Jubilee Gardens, to the main running lines in York Road via Chicheley Street.

Architecture and design

The choice of Portland Stone cladding, and bronze framed individual upright windows were denounced by Modern Movement critics, and the centre's buildings have generally been regarded as dull. However, the extremely traditional cladding has meant that the buildings have weathered better than most of their contemporaries with concrete or aggregate faced façades or curtain wall glazing.

The original interiors were luxuriously appointed, and as well as contributions from a British design team (many of whom had worked on the Festival of Britain), they included work by Ernesto Nathan Rogers who had worked on the Torre Velasca in Milan. Facilities for staff were lavish by the standards of the time, and the basement of the building was designed with a full size swimming pool and a spacious gymnasium.

The basement also originally housed a rifle range, snooker room, a small supermarket for staff and a host of other facilities. Until 1998, there was also a fully equipped theatre (designed by Cecil Beaton) which – unusually for a space dedicated to amateur productions – had full fly tower facilities.

The courtyard of the Upstream Building included two notable sculptures:
 "Torsion Fountain" (also known as The Shell Fountain) by Franta Belsky is a tall bronze column of shell like forms, which once poured water into one another; and
 "Motorcyclist" by Siegfried Charoux – a larger than life figure of a rider astride his machine.

The public realm of the Upstream Building has been steadily degraded over the years, with the generous space between the columns of the entrance from York Road enclosed to enlarge the foyers. Textured paving in contrasting colours was installed to assist partially sighted pedestrians navigate the complex steps and ramps of the site, but also served to deter rough sleepers and skateboarders.

Construction
The tower was the first London office tower to exceed the height of the Victoria Tower of the Palace of Westminster.

It replaced the Midland Grand Hotel as the tallest storied building in London, and the Royal Liver Building as the tallest in the United Kingdom. On completion the building also held the record for the largest office building, by floor space, in Europe.

Functions and occupation of the buildings

In addition to being the headquarters for the group, it also acts as the main offices of the following Shell businesses; refining and marketing, along with a number of functional support activities such as finance and human resources. The Shell Centre is also the head office of Shell's United Kingdom business (Shell UK Ltd.), which was formerly located in Shell Mex House.

In 2004, a planning application was approved to convert the lower floors of the Upstream Building courtyard and the former staff cafeteria into a shopping centre, and to construct a contrasting new glazed office building on the Podium Site to the south, which is currently a paved open space.  The sculptures would be relocated.

In 2009, staff working in the building were notified of a proposal to redevelop much of the site whilst leaving the tower intact. This would require relocating staff during 2011 for up to seven years whilst construction work took place, incorporating parts of the open spaces around the current building. No planning permission has yet been sought.

In July 2011, Shell announced that a joint venture of Canary Wharf Group and Qatari Diar had bought a virtual freehold (an 999-year lease) on the Shell Centre for £300m, and would redevelop the site. The tower was to be left in place, but the rest of the site was replaced by a new scheme of offices, shops and restaurants. The new development is called Southbank Place.

See also

 Tall buildings in London

References

External links
Emporis.com

Skyscrapers in the London Borough of Lambeth
Buildings and structures in the London Borough of Lambeth
Office buildings completed in 1961
Shell plc buildings and structures
Buildings and structures on the River Thames
Skyscraper office buildings in London